Plastic Soda is the second studio album by the Brazilian musician Jupiter Apple, released on September 1, 1999 by independent label Trama. Unlike its predecessor, it is fully sung in English and mixes more elements of jazz and traditional Brazilian genres such as samba and bossa nova amid the psychedelia Jupiter Apple is known for. Marcelo Birck, who previously collaborated with the musician in A Sétima Efervescência, returns for this release. Future Cachorro Grande guitarist Marcelo Gross was also a guest musician, providing drums.

The title of the track "Bridges of Redemption Park" is a reference to the Farroupilha Park (also known as Redemption Park) in Porto Alegre, Jupiter Apple's hometown.

Track listing

Personnel
 Jupiter Apple – lead vocals, electric guitar, bass guitar, keyboards, percussion, production, cover art
 Marcelo Birck – electric guitar, arrangements (track 5)
 Julio Cascaes – bass guitar
 Marcelo Gross – drums
 Gustavo Dreher – flute

References

1999 albums